This is a list of French regions and overseas territories by Human Development Index as of 2021. The regions since 2016 that the pre-2016 regions correspond to or are part of are shown alongside.

References 

Economy of France
France
France